Judo at the 1991 European Youth Olympic Days was held in Brussels, Belgium between 18 and 20 July 1991.

Medal summary

Events

References

External links
 

1991 European Youth Olympic Days
European Youth Olympic Days
1991